Gage may refer to:

Measurement
 Gage is a variant spelling of the word gauge
Stream gauge, aka Stream gage, a site along a stream where flow measurements are made

People
Gage (surname)
Gage Golightly (born 1993), American actress

Places

Hong Kong
Gage Street, Hong Kong

United States
Gage, Kentucky
Gage, New Mexico
Gage, Oklahoma
Gage, West Virginia
Gage County, Nebraska
Gage Park, Chicago, Illinois

Other uses
Gage (finance) a medieval financial instrument, and the origin of the word mortgage
Gage Educational Publishing Company
Gage Roads, a sea channel near Perth, Western Australia
A. S. Gage Ranch, in west Texas
Great American Gymnastics Express, a gymnastics academy located in Missouri
Greengage or gage, a plum-like fruit
Nathaniel Parker Gage School, listed on the National Register of Historic Places in Washington, D. C.
USS Gage (APA-168), US attack transport ship
Weather gage, in military sea tactics, a windward position relative to an enemy ship
Cadillac Gage Commando, used by Police
Surety, in an action of debt; see

See also
Gaige (disambiguation)
Gauge (disambiguation)

English unisex given names
English masculine given names
English feminine given names